Naysha Lopez is the stage name of drag performer and beauty pageant participant Fabian Rodriguez, who won the Miss Continental competition and appeared on the eighth season of RuPaul's Drag Race.

Career 
Rodriquez is a licensed cosmetologist. Naysha Lopez won the 2013 Miss Continental competition.

Naysha Lopez competed on the eighth season of RuPaul's Drag Race in 2016, after building a drag career in Puerto Rico. She was the first contestant eliminated, losing the lip sync battle to "Applause" by Lady Gaga against Laila McQueen. Naysha Lopez returned to the competition on the third episode and became the first contestant on the show to be eliminated twice. Queerty's Timothy Allen said she was "one of the most beautiful queens to ever compete on the show". Similarly, Michael Cook of South Florida Gay News said she was "arguably one of the most stunningly gorgeous queens to ever stomp the runway" on the series to date. At RuPaul's DragCon LA in 2018, Naysha Lopez and Tempest DuJour tied for "fan favorite" in the RuPaul's DragCon Pageant, where "queens who were eliminated first on their seasons battled it out for the crowd" according to Patrick Crowley of Billboard.

In 2021, Rodriguez was a runner-up in the Mr. Continental competition and won in the swimsuit category.

In 2022, Naysha Lopez was among a group of drag queens who performed on stage with Jennifer Lopez at the iHeartRadio Music Awards.

Personal life 
Rodriguez has a working class background. He is from Chicago and was living in the Northwest Side and working in Boystown, as of 2016.

Naysha Lopez is a member of the House of Hall, a drag "family" which includes fellow Drag Race contestants Dida Ritz, Jaida Essence Hall, and Kahmora Hall.

Filmography
 RuPaul's Drag Race (season 8), 2016
 RuPaul's Drag Race: Untucked, 2016
 Whatcha Packin''', 2016
 Hey Qween!, 2017
 The Pit Stop'', 2022

References

External links
 Fabian Rodriguez at IMDb

Year of birth missing (living people)
Living people
American drag queens
Beauty pageant contestants
LGBT people from Illinois
People from Chicago
RuPaul's Drag Race contestants